Le Magny may refer to the following communes in France:

 Le Magny, Indre, in the Indre department
 Le Magny, Vosges, in the Vosges department